Mills River is a town in Henderson County, North Carolina, United States. The population was 6,802 at the 2010 census, and was estimated to be 7,406 in 2019. The town took its name from the nearby confluence of the Mills River and French Broad River. It is part of the Asheville Metropolitan Statistical Area. It was incorporated into a town in June 2003. Sierra Nevada opened a brewery in Mills River in 2014.

History
Prior to European colonization a large Cherokee settlement existed within the borders of Mills River.

Mills River is among the oldest communities in Henderson County, with its first landholder receiving a deed from the state of North Carolina in 1788. It was once a thriving agricultural community, often called the "fertile crescent".

The Mills River Chapel was listed on the National Register of Historic Places in 1988.

Geography
Mills River lies in the northwestern part of Henderson County, extending northeast to the Buncombe County border and southwest to the Transylvania County border. It is bordered to the northeast by the city of Asheville and the town of Fletcher, and to the south by the unincorporated communities of Horse Shoe and Etowah.

The French Broad River, one of the primary tributaries of the Tennessee River, flows through the northeastern part of the town. The Mills River, a tributary of the French Broad, flows from west to east through the center of the town, and the southern part of the town is in the valley of Boylston Creek, a small tributary of the French Broad.

The town lies within minutes of Pisgah National Forest, Interstate 26, and Asheville Regional Airport. Highways 280 and 191 serve as the major arteries and provide access to the nearby cities of Asheville,  to the north; Hendersonville,  to the southeast; and Brevard,  to the southwest.

Demographics

2020 census

As of the 2020 United States census, there were 7,078 people, 3,072 households, and 2,046 families residing in the town.

Government
The current mayor is Shanon Gonce, who took office in December 2021, elected by his fellow town council members. The current town council members are Randy Austin (2019), Jeff Young (appointed March 2022), James Cantrell (2021), and Sandra Goode (2021). Councilman Austin also serves the role of Mayor Pro Tem.

Mills River is home to two public schools: Mills River Elementary, Glenn C. Marlow Elementary, and is served Rugby Middle School, and West Henderson High School.

The Town Hall and Library are located at 124 Town Center Drive. Surrounding the Town Hall is Mills River Park, whose master plan includes ball fields, soccer fields, tennis courts, playgrounds, multi-use trails, a dog park, shelters and support facilities. The Mills River runs along the northern boundary of the property.

References

External links

Town of Mills River official website
Henderson County Partnership for Economic Development

Towns in North Carolina
Towns in Henderson County, North Carolina
Asheville metropolitan area
Populated places established in 2003